Intime is an album by Bosnian pop singer Maya Berović. It was published on 6 August 2020 for XL Elit Invest record label. The record contains ten pop-folk tracks with elements of electronic, europop, trap and dance music.

Background 
Two years have passed since the release of her previous album "7". She's been since working hard on her new album, which consists of ten new songs and as many music videos.  Only 365 days were enough to visit Europe and South America to shoot all music videos for the songs.

Thus, on the map of her music video shoots, she listed Serbia, Dominican Republic and Cologne, Germany and the largest "Pop-up" candy museum in the world 
where she shot a video for the song "Bonbon".

However, for the album's title song, she was the first in the Balkan region to make a video with a mobile device  Huawei P40 Pro+, which turned out to be ideal, judging by the comments of the audience.

Track listing 
 "Intime"
 "Honey"
 "Moto"
 "Verna ko pas"
 "Niko kao on"
 "Breme"
 "Bonbon"
 "Kunem se u nas"
 "La la la"
 "Niko ne zna"
 "Uloga"
 "Zmaj"
Tracks 11 & 12 were added as Bonus Tracks on CD & Memory Stick

Release history

References

2020 albums
Maya Berović albums